Emanuel McNeil (born June 9, 1967) is a former American football defensive tackle. He played for the New England Patriots in 1989, the New York Jets in 1990 and for the Winnipeg Blue Bombers in 1991.

References

1967 births
Living people
American football defensive tackles
UT Martin Skyhawks football players
New England Patriots players
New York Jets players
Winnipeg Blue Bombers players